Ksenija Turković (born 13 February 1964) is a Croatian jurist and current vice-president and was judge at the European Court of Human Rights (ECHR).

Biography 
Turković graduated from the Faculty of Law in Zagreb in 1987 and became a lecturer at the same university.  She holds both a Master of Laws and a Doctor of Juridical Science from Yale Law School. 

Turković practiced law while working for American law firms between 1995 and 2000, and was a member of the New York State Bar Association between 1996 and 2008. She became a full professor at the University of Zagreb in 2008. She was the head of the team of experts which developed the new Criminal Code in Croatia between 2009 and 2011. She was the vice-president of two expert committees of the Council of Europe focused on the protection of children's rights. 

On 2 October 2012, Turković was elected as a judge of the ECHR by the Parliamentary Assembly of the Council of Europe (PACE) out of three candidates succeeding Nina Vajić In May 2020, she became vice-president of the ECHR for one year. Her office as judge ended the 1 January 2022

She was cited in an NGO report about the judges of the European Court of Human Rights for her links with the Open Society Foundation as she seated in cases where the Open Society Foundation or one of its partners was either the applicant or a third party involved.

Works 
Turković is the author and contributor to several books focusing on law.

References 

Croatian judges of international courts and tribunals
Croatian judges
Croatian lawyers
1964 births
Living people
Lawyers from Zagreb
University of Zagreb alumni
Yale Law School alumni